60 Cancri is a star in the zodiac constellation Cancer, located about 850  light years away from the Sun. It is visible to the naked eye as a faint, orange-hued star with an apparent visual magnitude of +5.44. 60 Cancri is situated near the ecliptic, so it is subject to the occasional occultation by the Moon. It is moving away from the Earth with a heliocentric radial velocity of +25 km/s.

This is an aging giant star with a stellar classification of K5 III, indicating it has exhausted the hydrogen at its core and evolved off the main sequence. It is a suspected variable star of unknown type. It is around 1.15 billion years old with 1.4 times the mass of the Sun. The star is radiating 670 times the Sun's luminosity from its enlarged photosphere at an effective temperature of 4,150 K.

References

K-type giants
Cancer (constellation)
Durchmusterung objects
Cancri, 60
076351
043851
3550